Independente Atlético Clube de Tucuruí, commonly referred to as Independente, is a Brazilian professional club based in Tucuruí, Pará founded on 28 November 1972. It competes in the Campeonato Paraense, the top flight of the Pará state football league.

History
The club was founded on November 28, 1972.

Men's team
The club won the Campeonato Paraense Second Level in 2009, and the Campeonato Paraense in 2011, after beating Paysandu in the final on a penalty shootout after the score was 3-3. They competed in the Série D in 2011, when they were defeated in the Quarterfinals by Cuiabá 2-0 and 4-2.

Women's team
They competed in the Copa do Brasil de Futebol Feminino in 2007, when they were eliminated in the First Round by Rio Norte.

Honours
 Campeonato Paraense
 Winners (1): 2011

 Campeonato Paraense Second Division
 Winners (1): 2009

Stadium
Independente Atlético Clube play their home games at Navegantão. The stadium has a maximum capacity of 8,000 people.

References

Association football clubs established in 1972
Football clubs in Pará
1972 establishments in Brazil